Shoalwater is a coastal locality in the Livingstone Shire, Queensland, Australia.

Geography
The waters and inlets of the Coral Sea form the north-eastern boundary and part of the eastern. The Shoalwater Bay Military Training Area occupies most of the locality.

References 

Shire of Livingstone
Coastline of Queensland
Localities in Queensland